Poindexter is a Jèrriais surname most commonly found in the United States, but originally from the island of Jersey between Britain and France, where it survives in its original form of Poingdestre.

Notable people and characters with the name include:

People
 Alan G. Poindexter (1961–2012), American astronaut, son of John Poindexter
 Anthony Poindexter (born 1976), American football coach
 Buster Poindexter, pseudonym of American rock musician David Johansen (born 1950)
 Camilla Poindexter, American reality television personality and model
 Charles Poindexter (born 1942), American politician from Virginia
 Doug Poindexter (1927–2004), American country musician
 George Poindexter (1779–1853), American politician
 Hildrus Poindexter (1901–1987), epidemiologist and scientist
 James Poindexter (born 1949), American sport shooter
 James Preston Poindexter (1819–1907), American civil rights activist
 Jennings Poindexter (1910–1983), American baseball player
 Admiral John Poindexter (born 1936), National Security Advisor for the Reagan administration, involved in the Iran–Contra affair
 John Q. Poindexter (1854–1932), American state senator from Mississippi
 Joseph B. Poindexter (1869–1951), territorial governor of Hawaii
 Larry Poindexter (born 1959), American actor
 Miles Poindexter (1868–1946), American politician
 Pony Poindexter (1926–1988), American jazz musician
 Robert Poindexter (1897–1930), American baseball player
 Robert Poindexter (politician), American politician
 Steve Poindexter (born 1965), American house producer and DJ

Fictional characters
 Sir Marmaduke Poindexter, a character in Gilbert and Sullivan's comic opera The Sorcerer.
 Poindexter, a character in the animated TV series Felix the Cat (1959–1962), whose name has become a slang term meaning "a bookish or socially unskilled person"
 Arnold Poindexter, a character in the film Revenge of the Nerds and its sequel Revenge of the Nerds II: Nerds in Paradise
 Benjamin Poindexter is an alias sometimes used by Bullseye (comics)
 Mr. Poindexter, in the Nick Carter spy novels, runs the Special Effects and Editing department (in charge of weapons, gadgets, disguises, and papers) in the US spy agency AXE, where he is the equivalent to Q in the James Bond franchise
 Sidney Poindexter, a nerdy ghost who loathes bullies, appears in the cartoon Danny Phantom
 William Poindexter, a member of Samwell's hockey team in Check, Please! (webcomic)
 Poindexter "Fool" Williams, a character in the film The People Under the Stairs.